Tharavad /Tharavadu (തറവാട്), is the Malayalam word for the ancestral home of aristocratic families in Kerala, which usually served as the common house for the joint family system practiced in the state. The German linguist Hermann Gundert, in his Malayalam—English dictionary published in 1872, defines a tharavadu as, "An ancestral residence of land-owners and kings", and also as, "A house, chiefly of noblemen". Contemporary usage of the word is now more generic to all social classes and religions in Kerala. By extension, the word refers not just to the family's house but to the extended family that shares that house.

In the Nair Tharavadu, the head of the family was known as Karnavar and the inheritance was matrilineal.  In the Namboothiri Tharavadu, the inheritance was patrilineal.

Old Tharavadu houses have a unique Kerala style architecture with a courtyard or many courtyards - enclosed within the building, including wells. House with one courtyard is a Nalukettu, one with two is an Ettukettu, and one with a four courtyards is Pathinarukettu. There were specific location for prayer place, kitchen, storage for grains, living place for women, men - both married and unmaried etc.

References

Kerala society
Culture of Kerala
Social history of Kerala